The Calliptaminae are a subfamily of grasshoppers containing species found in Africa, Europe and Asia; some are economically important. It was originally erected as a tribe by G.G. Jacobson in 1905 as the "Calliptamini", later uprated by Dirsh in 1956.

Genera
The Orthoptera Species File includes:
 Acorypha Krauss, 1877
 Bosumia Ramme, 1929
 Braxyxenia Kirby, 1914
 Calliptamus Serville, 1831
 Damaracris Brown, 1972
 Indomerus Dirsh, 1951
 Palaciosa Bolívar, 1930
 Paracaloptenus Bolívar, 1876
 Peripolus Martínez y Fernández-Castillo, 1898
 Sphodromerus Stål, 1873
 Sphodronotus Uvarov, 1943
 Stobbea Ramme, 1929

References

Acrididae
Orthoptera subfamilies